Dyschirius assegaaicus is a species of ground beetle in the subfamily Scaritinae. It was described by Fedorenko in 2000.

References

assegaaicus
Beetles described in 2000